Jeroen D'hoedt (also D'Hoedt, born 10 January 1990) is a middle-distance runner from Belgium. At the 2013 European Cross Country Championships he was about to win a bronze medal, but Andy Vernon edged him out in a fast finishing sprint, clocking the same time of 29:35 as D'hoedt. He competed in the 3000 metres steeplechase at the 2016 Olympics, but failed to reach the final.

References

1990 births
Living people
Belgian male middle-distance runners
Belgian male steeplechase runners
Olympic athletes of Belgium
Athletes (track and field) at the 2016 Summer Olympics